Luis Santana (born 15 January 1937) is a Dominican former sports shooter. He competed in the skeet event at the 1968 Summer Olympics.

References

1937 births
Living people
Dominican Republic male sport shooters
Olympic shooters of the Dominican Republic
Shooters at the 1968 Summer Olympics
People from Hato Mayor del Rey